Consors (Latin consors, "partner") can refer to:

Cortal Consors, a European broker in personal investing and online trading
Catocala consors, a moth of the family Noctuidae
Caseolus consors, a land snail
Laosaurus consors, a species of Othnielosaurus dinosaur 
Abrictosaurus consors, a species of Abrictosaurus dinosaur
Crotalophorus consors, a synonym for the venomous pit viper species Sistrurus catenatus
Consors imperii, an ancient Roman partner in an emperorship
Valsaria consors, an alternate name for the plant canker Valsaria insitiva

See also
Consor